The National Numismatic Collection is the national coin cabinet of the United States. The collection is part of the Smithsonian Institution's National Museum of American History.

Overview
The National Numismatic Collection comprises approximately 1.6 million objects and is one of the world's largest and most diverse collections of coins, paper currency, medals, commodity currencies, financial instruments, exonumia, and related items.  As the collection of record for the U.S. monetary system, it holds the collections of the U.S. Mint, Treasury, and Bureau of Engraving and Printing. In addition, it includes collections donated by individual collectors and private institutions, such as the collection of the Chase Manhattan Bank Money Museum.

History
Until 2004, the exhibit housing the Collection was the last surviving exhibit from the Smithsonian Institution's National Museum of American History's original 1964 arrangement.  In late 2004, the exhibit was closed, and the objects were returned to the Smithsonian's vaults.  In 2015, the museum opened a new permanent Gallery of Numismatics with an exhibition titled The Value of Money.

Noteworthy items in the collection
A gold 20 Excelentes coin of Ferdinand and Isabella of Spain
Brasher half doubloon
All three types of the 1804 dollar
The 1849 double eagle
The two gold 1877 half unions
All nine 1909–1910 Washington nickels
One 1913 Liberty Head nickel
Two 1933 double eagles
The 1974 aluminum cent

See also
Alaskan parchment scrip
Art and engraving on United States banknotes
Early American currency
Federal Reserve Bank Note
Federal Reserve Note (Series 1914 and 1918)
Fractional currency
Gold certificate (United States)
Greenback (1860s money)
Historical armorial of U.S. states from 1876
Interest bearing note
Large denominations of United States currency
Silver certificate (United States)
Treasury Note (1890–1891)

References

External links 

[[Category:Smithsonian Institution|Numismatic Collection]
Numismatic Collection
United States